The stria medullaris is a part of the epithalamus. It is a fiber bundle containing afferent fibers from the septal nuclei, lateral preoptico-hypothalamic region, and anterior thalamic nuclei to the habenula. It forms a horizontal ridge on the medial surface of the thalamus, and is found on the border between dorsal and medial surfaces of thalamus. Superior and lateral to habenular trigone.

It projects to the habenular nuclei,
from anterior perforated substance and hypothalamus, to habenular trigone, to habenular commissure, to habenular nucleus.

References

Epithalamus
Thalamus